The Caldbeck transmitting station is a broadcasting and telecommunications facility, situated close to the village of Caldbeck, in Cumbria, England (Grid Reference: NY299425). It is owned and operated by Arqiva.

It includes a  guyed steel lattice mast, which is the third highest structure in the United Kingdom.  The transmission antennas surmounting the structure are contained within a fibreglass cylinder.

History

The station was originally commissioned by the Independent Television Authority to bring ITV signals (provided by Border Television) to  South West Scotland and Northern parts of Cumberland and Westmorland, including Carlisle and Dumfries using 405-line on VHF Channel 11 (Band III). The BBC's VHF television and radio services were carried by the nearby Sandale transmitting station.

When UHF television started in the UK in 1969, Caldbeck was selected to carry all the 625-line services for the area.  The original three channel line-up came into service in September 1971. Channel 4 began from Caldbeck from its launch in November 1982. 405 line television was discontinued in the UK in 1985.

In 1993, CFM Radio launched from Caldbeck on 96.4 MHz FM, and later in 2001 the national digital multiplex Digital One entered service.

Digital switchover

Caldbeck was one of the first transmitters in the UK to be upgraded to high power digital only TV broadcasting. The Digital Switchover took place between June & July 2009. At this time, the analogue signal was permanently switched off. Extra multiplexes for BBC Scotland and ITV Border (Scotland) were added to the transmitter at the time.

Caldbeck underwent major engineering work to accommodate the new transmitters and aerials. The work entailed complete replacement of the existing mast with a brand new  mast, work on which began on 26 April 2007. Construction of the new mast structure was completed at the beginning of March 2008.  Once installation of the transmitting aerials on the new mast was complete, the old one was dismantled.

Services listed by frequency

Analogue radio (FM VHF)

Digital radio (DAB)

Digital television

Before switchover

Digital television

Analogue television

See also
List of masts
List of tallest structures in the United Kingdom
List of radio stations in the United Kingdom

References

External links
 Help, tips and advice as Cumbria leads the way to digital television
 The Transmission Gallery: Caldbeck Transmitter photographs and information
 The Transmission Gallery: TV Coverage Map
 http://skyscraperpage.com/diagrams/?b61323
 http://skyscraperpage.com/diagrams/?b61324
 Arqiva Caldbeck Mast Build Mini-site
 Caldbeck Transmitter at thebigtower.com

Radio masts and towers in Europe
Transmitter sites in England
Buildings and structures in Cumbria